Mitsuhiro Ishida (born December 29, 1978) is a retired Japanese mixed martial artist who competed in Shooto, Strikeforce, PRIDE, DREAM, and DEEP. A professional competitor from 2001 until 2011, Ishida also participated in the Yarennoka event in the Saitama Super Arena in Japan.

Background
Originally from the Ibaraki Prefecture in Japan, Ishida was a talented wrestler, ranking in the top five nationally during his high school years for the Greco-Roman category.

Mixed martial arts career

Early career
Ishida's professional debut was on July 6, 2001 at Shooto: To the Top 6 against Daisuke Sugie where he lost via unanimous decision. He then went on to win his next four fights. On February 17, 2006 he defeated Kenichiro Togashi to become the  Shooto Pacific Rim Welterweight Champion.

PRIDE
Ishida won his first four fights in the PRIDE organization, defeating fighters such as Marcus Aurelio and Cristiano Marcello.

At PRIDE Shockwave 2006 he lost to Takanori Gomi in a non-title fight on December 31, 2006, his first defeat in that organization. As a result of the loss to Gomi, he was unable to defend his Shooto Pacific Rim Welterweight Championship at a mandatory title defense in February 2007.

Yarennoka!
At Yarennoka!, Ishida handed future Strikeforce Lightweight Champion Gilbert Melendez his first loss, in a unanimous decision.

Strikeforce
Ishida made his United States mainland debut at Strikeforce: Playboy Mansion defeating Justin Wilcox by armbar.

DREAM
On March 15, 2008, Ishida competed in the opening round of the DREAM Lightweight Grand Prix, defeating Korean judoka Jung Bu-Kyung. He proceeded to lose to Caol Uno in the quarter-finals at DREAM 3 via rear- naked choke submission.

Ishida then defeated Daisuke Nakamura at DREAM 7.

Following matches in Shooto and Strikeforce, Ishida returned to the organization at DREAM 15, where he defeated Daiki Hata.

Retirement
On July 6, 2012 Ishida announced that he has retired from mixed martial arts competition.

Championships and Accomplishments
Shooto
Shooto Pacific Rim Welterweight Championship (1 time)

Mixed martial arts record

|-
| Loss
| align=center| 20–8–1
| Doo Ho Choi
| KO (knee and punches)
| DEEP: 56 Impact
| 
| align=center| 1
| align=center| 1:33
| Tokyo, Japan
| 
|-
| Loss
| align=center| 20–7–1
| Joachim Hansen
| Decision (split)
| DREAM: Fight for Japan!
| 
| align=center| 2
| align=center| 5:00
| Saitama, Japan
| 
|-
| Win
| align=center| 20–6–1
| Akiyo Nishiura
| Decision (split)
| DREAM 16
| 
| align=center| 2
| align=center| 5:00
| Nagoya, Japan
| 
|-
| Win
| align=center| 19–6–1
| Daiki Hata
| Decision (unanimous)
| DREAM 15
| 
| align=center| 2
| align=center| 5:00
| Saitama, Japan
| 
|-
| Loss
| align=center| 18–6–1
| Gilbert Melendez
| TKO (punches)
| Strikeforce: Carano vs. Cyborg
| 
| align=center| 3
| align=center| 3:16
| San Jose, California, United States
| 
|-
| Loss
| align=center| 18–5–1
| Mizuto Hirota
| TKO (punches)
| Shooto: Shooto Tradition Final
| 
| align=center| 1
| align=center| 1:33
| Tokyo, Japan
| 
|-
| Win
| align=center| 18–4–1
| Daisuke Nakamura
| Decision (unanimous)
| DREAM 7
| 
| align=center| 2
| align=center| 5:00
| Saitama, Japan
| 
|-
| Win
| align=center| 17–4–1
| Justin Wilcox
| Submission (armbar)
| Strikeforce: At The Mansion II
| 
| align=center| 1
| align=center| 1:29
| Beverly Hills, California, United States
| 
|-
| Loss
| align=center| 16–4–1
| Caol Uno
| Submission (rear-naked choke)
| DREAM 3: Lightweight Grand Prix 2008 Second Round
| 
| align=center| 2
| align=center| 1:39
| Saitama, Japan
| 
|-
| Win
| align=center| 16–3–1
| Bu Kyung Jung
| Decision (unanimous)
| DREAM 1: Lightweight Grand Prix 2008 First Round
| 
| align=center| 2
| align=center| 5:00
| Saitama, Japan
| 
|-
| Win
| align=center| 15–3–1
| Gilbert Melendez
| Decision (unanimous)
| Yarennoka
| 
| align=center| 2
| align=center| 5:00
| Saitama, Japan
| 
|-
| Loss
| align=center| 14–3–1
| Takanori Gomi
| TKO (soccer kick and punches)
| PRIDE FC: Shockwave 2006
| 
| align=center| 1
| align=center| 1:14
| Saitama, Japan
| 
|-
| Win
| align=center| 14–2–1
| David Bielkheden
| Decision (unanimous)
| PRIDE Bushido 13
| 
| align=center| 2
| align=center| 5:00
| Yokohama, Japan
| 
|-
| Win
| align=center| 13–2–1
| Cristiano Marcello
| Decision (unanimous)
| PRIDE Bushido 12
| 
| align=center| 2
| align=center| 5:00
| Nagoya, Japan
| 
|-
| Win
| align=center| 12–2–1
| Marcus Aurélio
| Decision (unanimous)
| PRIDE Bushido 11
| 
| align=center| 2
| align=center| 5:00
| Saitama, Japan
| 
|-
| Win
| align=center| 11–2–1
| Paul Rodriguez
| Submission (guillotine choke)
| PRIDE Bushido 10
| 
| align=center| 1
| align=center| 2:29
| Tokyo, Japan
| 
|-
| Win
| align=center| 10–2–1
| Kenichiro Togashi
| Decision (majority)
| Shooto: The Victory of the Truth
| 
| align=center| 3
| align=center| 5:00
| Tokyo, Japan
| 
|-
| Win
| align=center| 9–2–1
| Takashi Nakakura
| TKO (cut)
| Shooto: Alive Road
| 
| align=center| 3
| align=center| 1:31
| Yokohama, Japan
| 
|-
| Win
| align=center| 8–2–1
| Shinya Sato
| TKO (knees and punches)
| GCM: D.O.G. 1
| 
| align=center| 1
| align=center| 3:03
| Tokyo, Japan
| 
|-
| Win
| align=center| 7–2–1
| Daisuke Sugie
| Decision (unanimous)
| Shooto: Wanna Shooto 2004
| 
| align=center| 3
| align=center| 5:00
| Tokyo, Japan
| 
|-
| Loss
| align=center| 6–2–1
| Vítor Ribeiro
| Decision (unanimous)
| Shooto Hawaii: Soljah Fight Night
| 
| align=center| 3
| align=center| 5:00
| Honolulu, Hawaii, United States
| 
|-
| Win
| align=center| 6–1–1
| Yoichi Fukumoto
| Decision (unanimous)
| Shooto: 3/4 in Kitazawa Town Hall
| 
| align=center| 3
| align=center| 5:00
| Tokyo, Japan
| 
|-
| Win
| align=center| 5–1–1
| Takayuki Okochi
| Decision (unanimous)
| Shooto 2004: 1/24 in Korakuen Hall
| 
| align=center| 2
| align=center| 5:00
| Tokyo, Japan
| 
|-
| Draw
| align=center| 4–1–1
| Naoki Matsushita
| Draw
| Shooto: 7/13 in Korakuen Hall
| 
| align=center| 2
| align=center| 5:00
| Tokyo, Japan
| 
|-
| Win
| align=center| 4–1
| Kotetsu Boku
| Decision (unanimous)
| Shooto: 2/6 in Kitazawa Town Hall
| 
| align=center| 2
| align=center| 5:00
| Tokyo, Japan
| 
|-
| Win
| align=center| 3–1
| Masakazu Kuramochi
| Decision (unanimous)
| Shooto: Treasure Hunt 1
| 
| align=center| 2
| align=center| 5:00
| Tokyo, Japan
| 
|-
| Win
| align=center| 2–1
| Naoto Kojima
| TKO (punches)
| Shooto: Gig East 7
| 
| align=center| 2
| align=center| 1:58
| Tokyo, Japan
| 
|-
| Win
| align=center| 1–1
| Hiroki Kotani
| Decision (unanimous)
| Shooto: To The Top 9
| 
| align=center| 2
| align=center| 5:00
| Tokyo, Japan
| 
|-
| Loss
| align=center| 0–1
| Daisuke Sugie
| Decision (unanimous)
| Shooto: To The Top 6
| 
| align=center| 2
| align=center| 5:00
| Tokyo, Japan
|

See also
 List of male mixed martial artists

References

External links
 Pride profile
 

1978 births
Living people
Japanese male mixed martial artists
Featherweight mixed martial artists
Lightweight mixed martial artists
Mixed martial artists utilizing Greco-Roman wrestling
Japanese male sport wrestlers
Amateur wrestlers
Sportspeople from Ibaraki Prefecture